Richard Ledezma (born September 6, 2000) is an American professional soccer player who plays as a midfielder for Eredivisie club PSV Eindhoven.

Club career
Ledezma grew up in Phoenix, Arizona, where he played youth soccer for Valparaiso United FC. He made his professional debut for USL side Real Monarchs on April 11, 2018, as an 82nd-minute substitute in a 3–1 win over Seattle Sounders FC 2. On June 4, he scored his first career goal for Real Monarchs, as part of a performance for which he was named to the USL Team of the Week. On July 7, Ledezma was named the U.S. Soccer Development Academy Western Conference Player of the Year for the U-18/19 age group.

On December 21, Ledezma left Salt Lake to sign for Dutch club PSV Eindhoven on a one-and-a-half year deal. On October 27, 2019, after his strong play for Jong PSV, Ledezma made PSV's senior squad for the first time for an Eredivisie match with AZ Alkmaar. On November 1, 2020, Ledezma made his PSV debut in the 74th minute and recorded an assist in a 4–0 win over ADO Den Haag.

International career
Ledezma received his first international call-up from the United States under-19s in January 2018 and quickly advanced to the under-20 side. He earned his first start for the United States under-20 side against the French under-21s, helping the United States to a 1–0 victory.

On May 17, 2019, Ledezma revealed he was contacted by the Mexican Football Federation regarding switching to represent his ancestral Mexico. Ledezma did not close the door to representing either federation, but remained aligned with the United States for the time being.

On June 4, 2019, in the 2019 FIFA U-20 World Cup, Ledezma recorded an assist in the United States's 3–2 victory over France in the Round of 16, as his through-ball in the 25th minute split Boubacar Kamara and Dan-Axel Zagadou setting up Sebastian Soto for the finish.

He received his first call-up to the senior United States squad for matches against Wales and Panama in November 2020. On November 16, Ledezma made his senior national team debut against Panama when he came on as a substitute in the 68th minute and created two assists for goals by Sebastian Soto.

Personal life
Born in the United States, Ledezma is of Mexican descent.

Career statistics

Club

Honors
PSV
KNVB Cup: 2021–22
Johan Cruyff Shield: 2022

References

External links
Profile at the PSV Eindhoven website

2000 births
Living people
Association football midfielders
American soccer players
American sportspeople of Mexican descent
Real Monarchs players
Jong PSV players
Soccer players from Arizona
USL Championship players
Eerste Divisie players
United States men's under-20 international soccer players
United States men's international soccer players
American expatriate soccer players
Expatriate footballers in the Netherlands